Burkholderia arboris is a Gram-negative, aerobic, non-spore-forming bacterium of the genus Burkholderia and the family Burkholderiaceae. B. arboris belongs to the Burkholderia cepacia complex.

References

External links
Type strain of Burkholderia arboris at BacDive -  the Bacterial Diversity Metadatabase

Burkholderiaceae
Bacteria described in 2008